Lassi Viholainen (born 16 June 1999) is a Finnish professional footballer who plays as a winger.

Career
Viholainen is a product of TPS. He joined FC Inter Turku in 2016.

In July 2019, Viholainen was loaned out to AC Kajaani for the rest of the year. However, he was recalled already on 8 August 2019.

References

1999 births
Living people
Finnish footballers
FC Inter Turku players
AC Kajaani players
Veikkausliiga players
Ykkönen players
Association football wingers